Ole Børresen was a Danish sailor in the Dragon class. He became World Champion in 1993 and 1997 crewing for Jesper Bank. He is the son of Børge Børresen.

References

Danish male sailors (sport)
Dragon class sailors
Living people
Year of birth missing (living people)